This is a list of house types. Houses can be built in a large variety of configurations. A basic division is between free-standing or single-family detached homes and various types of attached or multi-family residential dwellings. Both may vary greatly in scale and the amount of accommodation provided.

By layout

Hut
A hut is a dwelling of relatively simple construction, usually one room and one story in height. The design and materials of huts vary widely around the world.

Bungalow
Bungalow is a common term applied to a low one-story house with a shallow-pitched roof (in some locations, dormered varieties are referred to as 1.5-story, such as the chalet bungalow in the United Kingdom).

Cottage
A cottage is a small house, usually one or two story in height, although the term is sometimes applied to larger structures.

Ranch

A ranch-style house or rambler is one-story, low to the ground, with a low-pitched roof, usually rectangular, L- or U-shaped with deep overhanging eaves. Ranch styles include:
 California ranch: the "original" ranch style, developed in the United States in the early 20th century, before World War II
 Tract ranch: a post-World War II style of ranch that was smaller and less ornate than the original, mass-produced in housing developments, usually without basements
 Suburban ranch: a modern style of ranch that retains many of the characteristics of the original but is larger, with modern amenities

I-house

An I-house is a two or three-story house that is one room deep with a double-pen, hall-parlor, central-hall or saddlebag layout.
 New England I-house: characterized by a central chimney
 Pennsylvania I-house: characterized by internal gable-end chimneys at the interior of either side of the house
 Southern I-house: characterized by external gable-end chimneys on the exterior of either side of the house

Gablefront

A gablefront house or gablefront cottage has a gable roof that faces its street or avenue, as in the novel The House of Seven Gables.
 A-frame: so-called because the steep roofline, reaching to or near the ground, makes the gable ends resemble a capital letter A.
 Chalet: a gablefront house built into a mountainside with a wide sloping roof
 Charleston single house: originating in Charleston, South Carolina, a narrow house with its shoulder to the street and front door on the side.

Split-level

Split-level house is a design of house that was commonly built during the 1950s and 1960s. It has two nearly equal sections that are located on two different levels, with a short stairway in the corridor connecting them.
 Bi-level, split-entry, or raised ranch
 Tri-level, quad-level, quintlevel etc.

Tower

A tower house is a compact two or more story house, often fortified.
 Irish tower houses were often surrounded by defensive walls called bawns
 Kulla: an Albanian tower house
 Peel tower or Pele tower: fortified tower houses in England and Scotland used as keeps or houses
 Vainakh tower: a tower house found in Chechenya and Ingushetia that reached up to four stories tall and were used for residential or military purposes, or both 
 Welsh tower houses: built mostly in the 14th and 15th centuries

Longhouse

A longhouse is historical house type typically for family groups.
 Geestharden house: one of the three basic house types in Schleswig-Holstein region of Germany
 Uthland-Frisian house: a sub type of Geestharden house of northwest Germany and Denmark
 Longère: a long and narrow house in rural Normandy and Brittany

Housebarn

A housebarn is a combined house and barn.
 Barndominium: a type of house that includes living space attached to either a workshop or a barn, typically for horses, or a large vehicle such as a recreational vehicle or a large recreational boat
 Byre-dwelling: farmhouse with people and livestock under one roof
 Connected farm: type of farmhouse common in New England
 Frutighaus: a type of barnhouse originating in the Frutigland region of Switzerland.

Other house types
 Courtyard house Riad: a type of courtyard house found in Morocco
 Siheyuan, Sanheyuan: a type of courtyard house found in China
 Snout house: a house with the garage door being the closest part of the dwelling to the street.
 Octagon house: a house of symmetrical octagonal floor plan, popularized briefly during the 19th century by Orson Squire Fowler
 Stilt house: is a house built on stilts above a body of water or the ground (usually in swampy areas prone to flooding).
 Villa: a large house which one might retreat to in the country. Villa can also refer to a freestanding comfortable-sized house, on a large block, generally found in the suburbs, and in Victorian terraced housing, a house larger than the average byelaw terraced house, often having double street frontage.
 Mansion: a very large, luxurious house, typically associated with exceptional wealth or aristocracy, usually of more than one story, on a very large block of land or estate. Mansions usually will have many more rooms and bedrooms than a typical single-family home, including specialty rooms, such as a library, study, conservatory, theater, greenhouse, infinity pool, bowling alley, or server room.
 Palace: the residence of a high ranking government official or the country's ruler.
 Castle: a heavily fortified medieval dwelling or a house styled after medieval castles. Usually with towers, crenellations, a stone exterior, get

By construction method or materials
 
 Airey house: a type of low-cost house that was developed in the United Kingdom during the 1940s by Sir Edwin Airey, and then widely constructed between 1945 and 1960 to provide housing for soldiers, sailors, and airmen who had returned home from World War II. These are recognizable by their precast concrete columns and by their walls made of precast "ship-lap" concrete panels.
 Assam-type House: an earthquake-resistant house type commonly found in the northeastern states of India
 Bastle house: a fortified farmhouse found in England and Scotland
 Castle: primarily a defensive structure/dwelling built during the Dark Ages and the Middle Ages, and also from the 18th century to today.
 Converted barn: an old barn converted into a house or other use.
 Earth sheltered: houses using dirt ("earth") piled against it exterior walls for thermal mass, which reduces heat flow into or out of the house, maintaining a more steady indoor temperature
 Pit-house: a prehistoric house type used on many continents and of many styles, partially sunken into the ground.
 Rammed earth Sod house Earthbag home Souterrain: an earthen dwelling typically deriving from Neolithic Age or Bronze Age times.
 Underground home: a type of dwelling dug and constructed underground. Ex. A Rammed-Earth Style House
 Yaodong: a dugout used as an abode or shelter in northern China, especially on the Loess Plateau
 Wattle and daub Adobe: a type of mudbrick house made of dirt and straw with mud used as mortar. Found throughout the world, in particular Spain, North Africa, the Middle East and the Americas.
 Igloo: an Inuit, Yup'ik, and Aleut seasonal or emergency shelter that was made of knife-sliced blocks of packed snow and/or ice in the Arctic regions of Alaska, Canada, Greenland, and Siberian Russia.
 Kit house: a type of pre-fabricated house made of pre-cut, numbered pieces of lumber.
 Sears Catalog Home: an owner-built "kit" houses that were sold by the Sears, Roebuck and Co. corporation via catalog orders from 1906 to 1940.
 Laneway house: a type of Canadian house that is constructed behind a normal single-family home that opens onto a back lane
 Log home, Log cabin: a house built by American, Canadian, and Russian frontiersmen and their families which was built of solid, unsquared wooden logs and later as a well crafted style of dwelling
 Plank house: a general term for houses built using planks in a variety of ways
 Pole house: a timber house in which a set of vertical poles carry the load of all of its suspended floors and roof, allowing all of its walls to be non-load-bearing.
 Prefabricated house: a house whose main structural sections were manufactured in a factory, and then transported to their final building site to be assembled upon a concrete foundation, which had to be poured locally.
 Manufactured house: a prefabricated house that is assembled on the permanent site on which it will sit.
 Modular home: a prefabricated house that consists of repeated sections called modules.
 Lustron house: a type of prefabricated house
 Stilt houses or Pile dwellings: houses raised on stilts over the surface of the soil or a body of water.
 Tree house: a house built among the branches or around the trunk of one or more mature trees and does not rest on the ground.
 Upper Lusatian house or Umgebinde: combined log and timber-frame construction in Germany-Czech Republic-Poland region
 Wimpey no-fines house: a low-cost semi-attached or terraced houses built in the United Kingdom from the 1940s onwards using concrete without fine aggregates ("no-fine")

 Single-family attached 

 Two-family or duplex: two living units, either attached side by side and sharing a common wall (in some countries, called semi-detached) or stacked one atop the other (in some countries, called a double-decker)
 Three-family or triplex: three living units, either attached side by side and sharing common walls, or stacked (in some countries, called a three-decker or triple-decker)
 Four-family or quadplex or quad: four living units, typically with two units on the first floor and two on the second, or side-by-side
 Townhouse, terraced house, or rowhouse: common terms for single-family attached housing, whose precise meaning varies by location, often connecting a series of living units arranged side-by-side sharing common walls (not to be confused with the English term for an aristocratic mansion, townhouse (Great Britain))
 Linked house: side-by-side attached houses that appear detached above-ground but are attached at the foundation below-ground
 Linked semi-detached: side-by-side attached houses with garages in between them, sharing basement and garage walls
 Mews property: an urban stable-block that has often been converted into residential properties. The houses may have been converted into ground floor garages with a small flat above which used to house the ostler or just a garage with no living quarters.
 Patio house: townhouses that share a patio
 Weavers' cottage: townhouses with attached workshops for weavers

 Movable dwellings 
 Chattel house: a small wooden house occupied by working-class people on Barbados. Originally relocatable; personal chattel (property) rather than fixed real property.

 Mobile home, park home, or trailer home: a prefabricated house that is manufactured off-site and moved by trailer to its final location (but not intended to be towed regularly by a vehicle)

 Recreational vehicle or RV: a motor vehicle or trailer that can be used for habitation
 Travel trailer, camper or caravan: a trailer designed to be used as a residence (usually temporarily), which must be towed regularly by a vehicle and cannot move under its own power
 Houseboat includes float houses: a boat designed to be primarily used as a residence
 Tent: a temporary, movable dwelling usually constructed with fabric covering a frame of lightweight wood or other locally-available material
 Tipi: a conical tent originating in North America
 Yurt''': a round tent with a conical roof originating in Central Asia

See also 

 Cohousing
 Company town
 City block
 Home
 House
 Gated community
 Intentional Community
 List of house styles
 Outbuilding
 Planned Unit Development
 Real estate
 Jerome Soltan
 Spite house, which may or may not be attached to other structures
 Sustainable design
 Timeshare, form of vacation property
 Total institution

Notes

References

External links

 House Images
 Architectural Housing Styles at Old House Web
 Bilingual Glossary of House types 
 A comprehensive summary of common residential architectural styles and themes

 
 
House types